The Royal Norwegian Air Force (RNoAF) is the air force of Norway. It was established as a separate arm of the Norwegian Armed Forces on 10 November 1944. The RNoAF's peacetime establishment is approximately 2,430 employees (officers, enlisted staff and civilians). 600 personnel also serve their draft period in the RNoAF. After mobilization, the RNoAF would consist of approximately 5,500 personnel.

The infrastructure of the RNoAF includes seven airbases (at Ørland, Rygge, Andøya, Evenes, Bardufoss, Bodø and Gardermoen), one control and reporting centre (at Sørreisa) and three training centres at Værnes in Stjørdal, 32.7 km north of Trondheim, where Trondheim airport now lies, Kjevik in Kristiansand and at KNM Harald Haarfagre/Madlaleiren in Stavanger.

History

Conception
Military flights started on 1 June 1912. The first plane, was bought with money donated by the public and piloted by Hans Dons, second in command of Norway's first submarine HNoMS Kobben (A-1). Until 1940 most of the aircraft belonging to the Navy and Army air forces were domestic designs or built under license agreements, the main bomber/scout aircraft of the Army air force being the Dutch-originated Fokker C.V.

World War II

Build-up for World War II

Before 1944, the Air Force were divided into the Norwegian Army Air Service  (Hærens Flyvevaaben) and the Royal Norwegian Navy Air Service (Marinens Flyvevaaben).

In the late 1930s, as war seemed imminent, more modern aircraft were bought from abroad, including twelve Gloster Gladiator fighters from the UK, and six Heinkel He 115s from Germany. Considerable orders for aircraft were placed with United States companies during the months prior to the invasion of Norway on 9 April 1940.

The most important of the US orders were two orders for comparatively modern Curtiss P-36 Hawk monoplane fighters. The first was for 24 Hawk 75A-6 (with 1200 hp Pratt & Whitney R-1830-SC3-G Twin Wasp engines), 19 of which were delivered before the invasion. Of these 19, though, none were operational when the attack came. A number were still in their shipping crates in Oslo harbour, while others stood at the Kjeller aircraft factory, flight ready, but none combat ready. Some of the Kjeller aircraft had not been fitted with machine guns, and those that had been fitted still lacked gun sights.

The ship with the last five 75A-6s that were bound for Norway was diverted to the United Kingdom, where they were taken over by Royal Air Force (RAF). All 19 Norwegian P-36s that were captured by the German invaders were later sold by the German authorities to the Finnish Air Force, which was to use them to good effect during the Continuation War.

The other order for P-36s was for 36 Hawk 75A-8 (with 1200 hp Wright R-1820-95 Cyclone 9 engines), none of which were delivered in time for the invasion, but were delivered to  "Little Norway" near Toronto, Ontario, Canada. There they were used for training Norwegian pilots until the USAAF took over the aircraft and used them under the designation P-36G.

Also ordered prior to the invasion were 24 Northrop N-3PB float planes built in on Norwegian specifications for a patrol bomber. The order was made on 12 March 1940 in an effort to replace the Royal Norwegian Navy Air Service's obsolete MF.11 biplane patrol aircraft. None of the type were delivered by 9 April and when they became operational with the 330 (Norwegian) Squadron in May 1941 they were stationed at Reykjavík, Iceland performing anti-submarine and convoy escort duties.

Escape and exile
The unequal situation led to the rapid defeat of the Norwegian air forces, even though seven Gladiators from the fighter wing defended Fornebu airport against the attacking German forces with some success—claiming two Bf 110 heavy fighters, two He 111 bombers and one Junkers Ju 52 transport.  lost two Gladiators to ground strafing while they were rearming on Fornebu and one in the air, shot down by Future Experte Helmut Lent, injuring the sergeant pilot. After the withdrawal of allied forces, the Norwegian Government ceased fighting in Norway and evacuated to the United Kingdom on 10 June 1940.

Only aircraft of the Royal Norwegian Navy Air Service had the range to fly all the way from their last remaining bases in Northern Norway to the UK. Included amongst the Norwegian aircraft that reached the British Isles were four German-made Heinkel He 115 seaplane bombers, six of which were bought before the war and two more were captured from the Germans during the Norwegian Campaign. One He 115 also escaped to Finland before the surrender of mainland Norway, as did three M.F. 11s; landing on Lake Salmijärvi in Petsamo. A captured Arado Ar 196 originating from the German heavy cruiser Admiral Hipper was also flown to Britain for testing.

For the Norwegian Army Air Service aircraft the only option for escape was Finland, where the planes would be interned but at least not fall into the hands of the Germans. In all two Fokker C.V.s and one de Havilland Tiger Moth made it across the border and onto Finnish airfields just before the capitulation of mainland Norway. All navy and army aircraft that fled to Finland were pressed into service with the Finnish Air Force, while most of the aircrew eventually ended up in "Little Norway".

The Army and Navy air services established themselves in Britain under the command of the Joint Chiefs of Staff. Norwegian air and ground crews operated as part of the British Royal Air Force, in both wholly Norwegian squadrons and also in other squadrons and units such as RAF Ferry Command and RAF Bomber Command. In particular, Norwegian personnel operated two squadrons of Supermarine Spitfires: RAF 132 (Norwegian) Wing consisted of No. 331 (Norwegian) Squadron and RAF No. 332 (Norwegian) Squadron. Both planes and running costs were financed by the exiled Norwegian government.

In the autumn of 1940, a Norwegian training centre known as "Little Norway" was established next to Toronto Island Airport, Canada.

The Royal Norwegian Air Force (RNoAF) was established by a royal decree on 1 November 1944, thereby merging the Army and Navy air forces. No. 331 (Norwegian) Squadron defended London from 1941 and was the highest scoring fighter squadron in South England during the war.

Up until 8 May 1945, 335 persons had lost their lives while taking part in the efforts of the RNoAF.

Post-war air force

After the war the Spitfire remained in service with the RNoAF into the fifties.

In 1947, the Surveillance and Control Division acquired its first radar system, and around the same time the RNoAF got its first jet fighters in the form of de Havilland Vampires.

In 1949 Norway co-founded NATO, and soon afterwards received American aircraft through the MAP (Military Aid Program). The expansion of the Air Force happened at a very rapid pace as the Cold War progressed. Throughout the Cold War the Norwegian Air Force was only one of two NATO air forces—Turkey being the other—with a responsibility for an area with a land border with the Soviet Union, and Norwegian fighter aircraft had on average 500–600 interceptions of Soviet aircraft each year.

In 1959, the Anti-Aircraft Artillery was integrated into the Royal Norwegian Air Force.

In 1999, Norway participated with six F-16s during the NATO bombing of Yugoslavia.

21st century RNoAF
In October 2002, a tri-national force of 18 Norwegian, Danish, and Dutch F-16 fighter-bombers, with one Dutch Air Force KC-10A tanker, flew to the Manas Air Base in Kyrgyzstan, to support the NATO ground forces in Afghanistan as a part of the Operation Enduring Freedom. One of the missions was Operation Desert Lion.

On 27–28 January, Norwegian F-16s bombed Hezb-e Islami Gulbuddin Fighters in the Adi Ghar Mountains during the beginnings of Operation Mongoose.

In 2004, four F-16s participated on NATO's Baltic Air Policing operation.

Beginning from February 2006, eight Royal Netherlands Air Force F-16s, joined by four Royal Norwegian Air Force F-16s, supported NATO International Security Assistance Force ground troops mostly in the southern provinces of Afghanistan. The air detachment is known as the 1st Netherlands-Norwegian European Participating Forces Expeditionary Air Wing (1 NLD/NOR EEAW).

2010s
In 2011, a detachment of F-16s were sent to enforce the Libyan no-fly zone. In a statement, Foreign Minister Jonas Gahr Støre condemned the violence against "peaceful protesters in Libya, Bahrain and Yemen", saying the protests "are an expression of the people's desire for more participatory democracy. The authorities must respect fundamental human rights such as political, economic and social rights. It is now vital that all parties do their utmost to foster peaceful dialogue on reforms". On 19 March 2011, the Norwegian government authorized the Royal Norwegian Air Force for deployment in Libya. Norway approved six F-16 fighters and personnel. The deployment started on 21 March and operated from the Souda Air Base in Souda Bay on Crete. 

On 24 March 2011, F-16s from the Royal Norwegian Air Force were assigned to the United States Africa Command during Operation Odyssey Dawn. On 25 March 2011, laser-guided bombs were launched from F-16s of the Royal Norwegian Air Force against Libyan tanks and during the night towards 26 March an airfield was bombed. Forces were also deployed to Operation Unified Protector on 26 March 2011. 

By July 2011, the Norwegian F-16's had dropped close to 600 bombs, some 17% of the total bombs dropped at that time. It was Norwegian F-16s that on the night towards 26 April, bombed Gaddafi's headquarter in Tripoli.

From September to December 2011, the Air Force contributed personnel and one P-3 Orion to Operation Ocean Shield. Operating from the Seychelles, the aircraft searched for pirates in the Somali Basin.

In April 2016 the life of a patient, at the hospital in Bodø, was saved when specialised medical equipment was ferried halfway across Norway, in less than half an hour, by an Air Force F-16 jet from Værnes Air Station.

On 29 March 2017, Norway signed a contract for five P-8As, to be delivered between 2022 and 2023.

On 3 November 2017, RNoAF took delivery of the first F-35A Lightning II.

2020s
In March 2021, RNoAF participated in Icelandic Air Policing with four F-35A Lightning II and 130 military personnel.

On 2 December 2021, RNoAF announced that twelve F-16As have been sold to Draken International. Transfer of the F-16As is expected to happen in 2022, pending formal approval by the US and Norwegian governments. In December 2021, Romania expressed their interest to purchase the rest of 32 F-16As.

On 6 January 2022, the F-35 officially took over the Quick Reaction Alert mission, ending the F-16 fleet’s 42 year-long mission.

In June 2022, Norway terminated a contract to acquire 14 NH90 helicopters, claiming that the supplier could not deliver and sustain the availability of combat capable aircraft that Norway required. All NH90 flight operations are discontinued, all acquired aircraft are planned to be returned to the manufacturer, and in due course Norway intends to acquire a new aircraft.

On 14 March 2023, RNoAF announced a contract for six SH-60 Seahawk as a replacement for the NH90. The three first helicopters will be delivered in 2025.

Plans
In 2016, research was started to consider the Boeing P-8A Poseidon MMA to replace the aging six P-3C Orion and two Falcon 20 aircraft by 2020 - 2025. In November 2016 the intention to acquire five was confirmed. On 5 March 2018, United States Department of Defense announced the award of a contract to Boeing that includes five P-8A Poseidons for RNoAF.

Organization

The RNoAF is organized in five Air Wings. These are divided into a total of one Control and Reporting Centre, nine flying squadrons as well as two ground based air defense units. The former distinctiontion between a Main Air Station and an Air Station was replaced by a new distinction between an Air Force Station and an Air Force Base.

 131 Air Wing, in Sørreisa
 Control and Reporting Centre Sørreisa, reports to NATO's Integrated Air Defense System CAOC Uedem in Germany
 Radar Station Njunis, with AT-31SL/N
 Radar Station Senja, with RAT-31SL/N
 Radar Station Honningsvåg, with RAT-31SL/N
 Radar Station Vestvågøy, with SINDRE I
 Radar Station Vågsøy, with SINDRE I
 Radar Station Skykula, with SINDRE I
 132 Air Wing, HQ at Ørland Air Station
 Ørland Air Station
 331 Squadron, with F-35A Lightning II
 332 Squadron, with F-35A Lightning II
 Testing, Training and Tactics Development Squadron, with F-35A Lightning II
 Aircraft Maintenance Group Ørland
 Air Defence Battalion NASAMS III times (2)
 Base Defense Squadron
 Base Operations Group Ørland
 Air Force Logistical Base
 NATO Airborne Early Warning Force – Forward Operating Location, for E-3A Sentry
 133 Air Wing, HQ at Evenes Air Station (moved over from Andøya Air Station)
 Evenes Air Station - The 333 Squadron will move to Evenes with the introduction of the P-8A Poseidon. The air station will also provide a forward deployment location for the F-35A fighters of the 132nd Air Wing. The expansion of Evenes Air Station and its increased importance will see the base field its own air defence unit with NASAMS III, independent from the one in Ørland and its own base defence squadron. When Evenes expands to its planned capability, the base will have the following composition:
 Evenes Staff Unit
 333 Squadron (333 skvadron), planned to operate with 5 Boeing P-8A Poseidon aircraft in the ASW, maritime patrol, ELINT and EW roles starting in 2023.
 Aircraft Maintenance Squadron
 Air Defence Battery  (separate from the Air Defence Battalion at Ørland air base)
 Base Defence Squadron
 Base Operations Squadron
 Base [Staff] Department()
 In addition to the strictly Air Force units Evenes Air Station will also house small contingents (personnel numbers in brackets) of the Norwegian Cyber Defence Force (CYFOR) (20), Norwegian Armed Forces Logistics Organisation (FLO) (30) and the Norwegian Defence Estates Agency (20) for a total planned personnel of 651 people at the base.
 Andøya Station Group at Andøya Air Force Base
 333 Squadron, with P-3C/N, ASW/multirole (unit will move to Evenes Air Base and Andøya will close down as an air base in 2023.)
 134 Air Wing, at Rygge Air Station
 Rygge Air Station
 339 Special Operations Aviation Squadron, with Bell 412 SP (Special forces support)
 Special Operations Air Task Group
 Gardermoen Station Group at Air Force Base Gardermoen, the military section of Oslo - Gardermoen IAP (The 135th Air Wing was disbanded in August 2018 and absorbed into the 134th Air Wing.)
 335 Squadron, with C-130J-30 Super Hercules
 717 Squadron, with DA-20 for electronic warfare.
 Armed Forces Center for Electronic Warfare ( (FEKS))
 Maritime Helicopter Wing, HQ at Bardufoss Air Station
 Bardufoss Air Station
 337 Squadron, with NHIndustries NH90NFH, also known as the Coast Guard Squadron, as the helicopters operate in support of the Norwegian Coast Guard
 Air Force Flying School, with MFI-17 Supporter
 Aircraft Maintenance Squadron
 Base Operations Squadron
 Air Force Base Haakonsvern (air force part of the Haakonsvern Naval Base
 334 Squadron, with NHIndustries NH90NFH, also known as the Frigate [Helicopter] Squadron, as the helicopters operate on board the Fridtjof Nansen-class frigates
 Station Group Banak, at Lakselv Airport
 Rescue Helicopter Service, HQ at Stavanger - Sola Air Station - In Norway air rescue is a domain of the Ministry of Justice and Public Security (Justis- og beredskapsdepartementet), which also finances these activities, including the funding for the acquisition of aerial assets (the old Sea King helicopters and their AW101 replacement are owned by the justice ministry). The Rescue Helicopter Service is the operational component, organised, manned and operated by the Air Force on behalf of the Ministry of Justice. Rescue helicopters maintain 15 minute readiness.
 330 Squadron, Search and Rescue with Sea King and phasing in AgustaWestland AW101 helicopters, at Sola Air Station
 Detachment Banak at Banak Air Force Base
 Detachment Bodø, at Bodø Air Force Base
 Detachment Ørland Ørland Air Station
 Detachment Rygge (Rygge Air Station
 Detachment Florø at Florø Airport (Operated by CHC Helikopter Service since 2017, while AW101 are being phased in).
 Air force Schools
 Royal Norwegian Air Force Academy, in Trondheim
 Air Force Air Operational Training and Certification Center, formerly Air Force Air Tactical School, at Rygge
 Air Force Flight Training School, at Bardufoss, listed above under the Bardufoss Air Station, Maritime Helicopter Wing entry.
 Air Defence Tactical School, at Ørland
 Air Force Base Defence Tactical School, at Værnes
 Air Force Control and Reporting School, at Sørreisa
 Air Force Flight Technical School, at Kjevik
 Air Force Specialists School, at Kjevik
 Air Warfare School, at Trondheim. In 2018 the Air Warfare School (Air Force Officer School) became part of the Armed Forces Academy and thus no longer part of the Air Force. Listed above as the Royal Norwegian Air Force Academy.

Aircraft

Current inventory 

NOTE: Norway is participating in three NATO programs giving them access to an Airbus A330 MRTT, 3 C-17’s and 5 RQ-4 Global Hawk's

Retired
Previous aircraft flown included the  F-16 Fighting Falcon, North American F-86K, Republic F-84G,  F-104 Starfighter, Northrop F-5, Lockheed T-33, Fairchild PT-26, Catalina PB5Y-A, Douglas C-47, DHC-3 Otter, Noorduyn Norseman, Cessna O-1, Bell UH-1B,  Bell 47G, P-3 Orion and the NHIndustries NH90 helicopter.

See also
 Free Norwegian forces
 List of military aircraft of Norway
 List of air forces
 Heavy Airlift Wing
 Strategic Airlift Capability

References

Bibliography

External links

 Norwegian Defence 2005 – Facts from the Ministry of Defence
 RNoAF Equipment Facts 
 History of the Royal Norwegian Air Force (Norwegian)
 Norwegian Aviation Museum
 ML407 – The Norwegian Story
 Norwegian Air Force – Air Show in Kristiansand
 RNoAF English pages

 
Military units and formations established in 1944
1944 establishments in Norway